Copa Airlines serves the following 88 destinations in 33 countries in the Americas and the Caribbean:

List

References

Lists of airline destinations
Copa Airlines
Star Alliance destinations